"Sanssouci" is a song written by Rufus Wainwright; appearing as a track on his fifth studio album, Release the Stars (2007). The name is a reference to the Sanssouci palace built by Frederick the Great in Potsdam, Germany.

The studio recording of the song used in Release the Stars includes both Wainwright's sister, Lucy Wainwright Roche, and his long-term friend singer-songwriter Teddy Thompson, on backing vocals.

Originally a French term, the expression "sans souci" translated into English means roughly "without worry", "without cares", or "carefree".

Personnel
 Rufus Wainwright – vocals, nylon string guitar
 Brad Albetta – bass
 Jason Boshoff – programming
 Marius de Vries – programming
 Pirmin Grehl – flute
 Gerry Leonard – guitar
 Ronith Mues – harp
 Jenni Muldaur – backing vocals 
 Jack Petruzelli – acoustic guitar
 Julianna Raye – backing vocals
 Teddy Thompson – backing vocals
 Lucy Wainwright Roche – backing vocals
 Joan Wasser – backing vocals

References

2007 songs
Rufus Wainwright songs
Song recordings produced by Rufus Wainwright
Songs written by Rufus Wainwright